James Fairman Fielder (February 26, 1867 – December 2, 1954) was an American politician of the Democratic party, who served as the 35th governor of New Jersey, from 1914 to 1917. He had previously served as acting governor in 1913 but stepped down from office to avoid constitutional limits on serving successive terms.

Early life and career
He was born in Jersey City, New Jersey on February 26, 1867, to United States Congressman George Bragg Fielder.

After law school, he became a member of the New Jersey General Assembly representing Hudson County, New Jersey from 1903 to 1904. He was then a member of the New Jersey Senate from Hudson County from 1908 to 1913.

Governor
The New Jersey Senate convened in January 1913 after Woodrow Wilson had won the 1912 Presidential Election and Fielder was selected to serve as President of the New Jersey Senate. This set him up to become acting Governor of New Jersey starting on March 1, 1913.

Resignation and return
Fielder resigned from his Senate office on October 28, 1913, so as to "create a vacancy in the governorship and avoid constitutional limits on succeeding himself". After winning "re-election," he took office on January 20, 1914, and served a full term in office, from January 20, 1914, to January 15, 1917.

Death
Fiedler died on December 2, 1954, of a heart attack at Mountainside Hospital. He was buried in the mausoleum in Fairmount Cemetery, Newark.

See also

List of governors of New Jersey

References

External links
Biography of James Fairman Fielder (PDF), New Jersey State Library
Dead Governors of New Jersey – James F. Fielder
James Fairman Fielder entry at The Political Graveyard

1867 births
1954 deaths
Episcopalians from New Jersey
Burials at Fairmount Cemetery (Newark, New Jersey)
Democratic Party governors of New Jersey
Democratic Party members of the New Jersey General Assembly
Democratic Party New Jersey state senators
Politicians from Jersey City, New Jersey
Presidents of the New Jersey Senate